Hathaway House may refer to:

Hathaway Barn, Willimantic, Maine, listed on the National Register of Historic Places in Piscataquis County, Maine
James D. Hathaway House, Fall River, Massachusetts, listed on the NRHP in Bristol County, Massachusetts
Hathaway Tenement, North Adams, Massachusetts, listed on the NRHP in Berkshire County, Massachusetts
David Carpenter House, currently known as the Hathaway House in Blissfield, Michigan
Hathaway Cottage, Saranac Lake, New York, listed on the NRHP in Franklin County, New York
Hathaway (Tannersville, New York), listed on the NRHP in Greene County, New York
Lot Hathaway House, East Claridon, Ohio, listed on the NRHP in Geauga County, Ohio 
Hathaway's Tavern, St. Albans, Vermont, listed on the NRHP in Franklin County, Vermont